The DUSK Music Festival (DUSK) is an annual two-day music festival held at Jácome Plaza, in Tucson, Arizona in early November.  Founded by John Rallis, Page Repp and Pete Turner in 2016, DUSK has three stages where musical artists from genres including rock, indie, country, EDM and hip hop perform for fans. The performances typically begin around 12:00 PM and continue until 11:00 PM on Saturday, and Sunday during the festival with various stages spread out in the urban plaza setting. Approximately 15,000 people attend the festival each year. 

In addition to the music performances, Tucson FEASTS highlights Tucson's thriving food traditions as well as its cutting edge cuisine with an incredible lineup of restaurants, food trucks and local chefs and Tucson ARTS provides an experience carefully crafted to awe and inspire new ways of thinking through a variety of larger-than-life sculptures, digital art, video projection and lighting displays throughout downtown Tucson and the Jácome Plaza festival grounds.

Lineups
NOTE: no festival in 2.020.

2019 

The fourth DUSK Music Festival was held on November 9+10, 2019 at Armory Park in Tucson, Arizona.  The performers included national artists, Kaskade, Rezz, Two Door Cinema Club, A R I Z O N A, Broncho, Cray, Dombresky, Fitz and the Tantrums, Goldroom, Malaa, Shallou, Tokimonsta, Wax Motif, What So Not, and Whethan as well as local artists, Drew Cooper, Billy Gatt, Enri, Future Syndicate and YKNOT B2B W.A.S.H., Housekneckt, Jason E. B2B Big Brother Beats, Junk James, Lo Key, Low Audio, McShite, Nocturnal Theory, Parsa, Sophia Rankin, Thoolan, Twelve Inches and Wolfie.

2018 

The third DUSK Music Festival was held on November 10+11, 2018 at Armory Park in Tucson, Arizona.  The performers included national artists, Dillon Francis, Phantogram, Big Gigantic, Cold War Kids, A-Trak, Jai Wolf, SuperDuperKyle, Anna Lunoe, Hoodboi, Andrew Luce, Madeaux, X.X.T., Cherub, AC Slater, Elohim, Falcons, and Elley Duhé, along with local artists including, Sur Block, Gram B2B SYNRGY, Mother Tierra, Juke and Traxler B2B HVRLY

2017 

The second DUSK Music Festival was held on October 6+7, 2017 Rillito Park in Tucson, Arizona.  The performers included national artists, Big Sean, Steve Aoki, Milky Chance, Louis the Child, Vince Staples, DJ Jazzy Jeff, Polica, Win and Woo, Trackstar the DJ, Orkesta Menzdoza and local artists, DJ YKNOT, Future Syndicate, Herm, Lando Chill, Powermix, Dr. SARCHAR B2B HVRLY.

2016 

The inaugural Dusk Music Festival was held on Saturday, October 22, 2016 at Rillito Park in Tucson, Arizona. The performers were Luna Aura, Gaby Moreno, Wild Belle, Calexico, A-Trak, DJ Mustard, Danny Brown, Matt and Kim, and RL Grime.

See also
List of music festivals in the United States
List of hip hop music festivals

References

External links
 Dusk Music Festival official website

2016 establishments in Arizona
Music festivals in Arizona
Music festivals established in 2016
Festivals in Tucson, Arizona